Annika Bruna (born 26 November 1956) is a French politician. She was elected as a National Rally (part of the Identity and Democracy group) Member of the European Parliament (MEP) in the 2019 European parliamentary election.

Early life and local political career
Annika Bruna was born on 26 November 1956 in Versailles, France.

Bruna was elected to the regional council of Île-de-France from 1998 to 2010. She is a former parliamentary assistant of the former president of the National Front Jean-Marie Le Pen.

European Parliament
Bruna stood as a candidate for National Rally in the 2019 European parliamentary election. She was eighteenth on her party's list, and elected as one of its 22 MEPs in France. She is part of the Identity and Democracy group. In the European Parliament, Bruna is a member of the Committee on Women's Rights and Gender Equality, and is part of the delegation for relations with Belarus.

Notes

References

1956 births
Living people
MEPs for France 2019–2024
21st-century women MEPs for France
National Rally (France) MEPs